José Edvar Simões, also commonly known as Edvar Simões, born 23 April 1943, is a former Brazilian professional basketball player and coach. Simões participated at the 1967 and 1970 FIBA World Championships with the Brazil national basketball team. He won a bronze medal at the 1964 Tokyo Olympics.

References

1943 births
Living people
Brazilian basketball coaches
Brazilian men's basketball players
1967 FIBA World Championship players
1970 FIBA World Championship players
Olympic bronze medalists for Brazil
Olympic basketball players of Brazil
Basketball players at the 1964 Summer Olympics
Basketball players at the 1968 Summer Olympics
Olympic medalists in basketball
Sport Club Corinthians Paulista basketball players
Medalists at the 1964 Summer Olympics
Sociedade Esportiva Palmeiras basketball players
Clube Atlético Monte Líbano basketball coaches